Karen Karnes (November 17, 1925 – July 12, 2016) was an American ceramist, best known for her salt glazed, earth-toned stoneware ceramics.[1] She was born in 1925 in New York City, where she attended art schools for children. Her garment worker parents were Russian and Polish Jewish immigrants, and the family lived in the Bronx Coops. Karen was influenced in many ways by her parents', communist philosophies, and has professed respect for working in small communities.

Education 
Karnes applied for and was accepted to the La Guardia High School. As a child she was surrounded by urban realities and visual influences, but she claims that her parents' old-world ideals kept her grounded.[2] At Brooklyn College she majored in design and graduated in 1946. After graduating, she studied abroad in Italy, where she continued to study ceramics.

After returning from Italy, Karnes began a graduate program at Alfred University, but left before completing her degree to work at Black Mountain College.

Black Mountain College 
Karnes first encountered Black Mountain College in 1947, where she took a summer design class with Josef Albers.

In 1952, she and her husband David Weinrib moved down to North Carolina to become potters-in-residence at the Black Mountain College. While at Black Mountain College, Karnes and Weinrib became acquainted with Merce Cunningham and John Cage, and later lived with them at the Gate Hill Community.

During the Pottery Seminar held at the college in 1952, Karnes met international potters Bernard Leach, Shoji Hamada, and Marguerite Wildenhain, as well as local potters Malcom Davis and Mark Shapiro. She was involved with the Southern Highland Craft Guild (then known as the Southern Highland Handicraft Guild) during her stay in North Carolina, selling her work in downtown Asheville.

Gate Hill Community 
Karnes lived at Gate Hill Cooperative in Stony Point, New York, for twenty-five years. She moved to the community in 1954, leaving Black Mountain College before its closing. At Gate Hill, she built her own studio and kilns, and worked with M.C. Richards and a local ceramics engineer to develop and popularize a flameproof clay body. With this clay, Karnes began making oven-top casserole dishes, a design she produced for over fifty years.

Work 
In 1967, Karnes first experimented with salt-firing at a workshop at the Penland School of Crafts.

Karnes' later work dealt with contemporary vessels, which were given different attention to design than her original pottery.[2] She made many traditionally functional forms and contemporary forms, but she also continued to produce casseroles, teapots, cups and bowls.

Another of her most well-known forms was the cut-lid jar, a form she first made at a workshop with Paulus Berensohn. Karnes continued to experiment with this form from the late 1960s until she stopped throwing.

She decided to live the rest of her life on a farm, working with clay and using old firing practices such as wood and salt firing.[2] In 1998, her house and studio burned to the ground because of a kiln fire.[4] With the help of donations from a large pottery sale, Karen rebuilt her country house and studio. She received a graduate fellowship from Alfred University, and won a gold medal for the consummate craftsmanship from The American Craft Council.[5] Her work has been displayed in numerous galleries and permanent collections worldwide.

References

Bibliography
"Interview with Karen Karnes." Smithsonian Archives of American Art, August 9–10, 2005
"Ceramics, Sculpture and Contemporary Art." Ferrin Gallery, 2006
Don't Know We'll See: The Work of Karen Karnes – Website for a film about Karen Karnes

External links 
 An interview with Karen Karnes, conducted in 2005 by Mark Shapiro, for the Archives of American Art

1925 births
2016 deaths
20th-century American women artists
American ceramists
American women ceramists
Brooklyn College alumni
Black Mountain College faculty
Black Mountain College alumni
American women academics
American people of Russian-Jewish descent
American people of Polish-Jewish descent
Artists from New York City
21st-century American women